Opicina (formerly Poggioreale del Carso in Italian), (Triestine: Opcina), is a town in northeastern Italy, close to the Slovenian border at Fernetti.  Opicina is a frazione of the comune of Trieste, the provincial and regional capital. The town has a large Slovene population, with Slovenian being widely used alongside Italian in private and public institutions. The first town near Opicina is Sežana in Slovenia, there is also the next railway station.

Geography
It is located on the Carso/Kras Plateau, 3 miles north of Trieste, a seaport on the Adriatic Sea.

Name
The name Opicina is of Slovene origin. It derives from "ob p'čine" ("ob pečini" in modern standard Slovene), meaning "by the cliff". Thus, it is among the Italian towns and villages in Friuli Venezia Giulia with a name of Slavic origin. Before World War I, it used to be known in Italian as Opcina, a name still used in the local Triestine dialect. During the Fascist regime, the name was first Italianized into Villa Opicina, and subsequently renamed to Poggioreale del Carso. In 1966 it was renamed again as Villa Opicina. However, it has been frequently referred to as Opicina, including on road signs.

History and culture

Population

It is inhabited by a Slovene minority in Italy. According to the last Austrian census of 1911, over 89% of the population was of Slovene ethnicity. In the following decades, this number fell significantly: according to the census of 1971, just above half of the population of the settlement belonged to the Slovene speaking community, while the rest were mostly Italian speakers. 

In the last three decades, immigration from the city of Trieste and other predominantly Italian-speaking areas have most probably reduced the Slovene speakers to a minority. However, Slovene language is still widely used in the settlement, both in private and public life. Most of the official signs are bilingual, Italian and Slovene.

The local Slovenes speak a distinctive version of the Inner Carniolan dialect, which shows strong influences of the neighboring Karst dialect.

Transport
The railway station Villa Opicina serves trains entering Italy from Slovenia, but does not provide a direct service to Trieste. At railway station is bus station also. From there the local buses connect village center and Trieste.

The Trieste–Opicina tramway, a unique hybrid of tramway and funicular railway, links Villa Opicina village with Piazza Oberdan in Trieste city centre.

Notable people from Opicina
Alojz Rebula
Zora Tavčar
Alenka Rebula Tuta

See also
Trieste–Opicina tramway
Slovene minority in Italy

Notes and references

External links

Frazioni of the Province of Trieste
Italy–Slovenia border crossings